The 1989 Israel Super Cup was the 18th Israel Super Cup (23rd, including unofficial matches, as the competition wasn't played within the Israel Football Association in its first 5 editions, until 1969), an annual Israel football match played between the winners of the previous season's Top Division and Israel State Cup. 

The match was played between Maccabi Haifa, champions of the 1988–89 Liga Leumit and Beitar Jerusalem, winners of the 1988–89 Israel State Cup.

This was Maccabi Haifa's 4th Israel Super Cup appearance (including unofficial matches) and Beitar's 6th. Watched by a crowd of 5,000 at Kiryat Eliezer  Stadium, Maccabi Haifa won the match 2–0.

Match details

References

1989
Super Cup
Super Cup 1989
Super Cup 1989
Israel Super Cup matches